Tituiyeh-ye Seh (also Romanized as Tītūīyeh-ye Seh; also known as Tītūīyeh) is a village in Bezenjan Rural District, in the Central District of Baft County, Kerman Province, Iran. At the 2006 census, its population was 86, in 18 families.

References 

Populated places in Baft County